Cryptophlebia is a genus of moths belonging to the subfamily Olethreutinae of the family Tortricidae.

Species
Cryptophlebia amamiana Komai & Nasu, 2003
Cryptophlebia amblyopa Clarke, 1976
Cryptophlebia amethystina (Diakonoff, 1953)
Cryptophlebia aniacra Diakonoff, 1983
Cryptophlebia aphos Diakonoff, 1983
Cryptophlebia atrilinea Clarke, 1976
Cryptophlebia azuaya Razowski, 1999
Cryptophlebia caeca Diakonoff, 1969
Cryptophlebia callosoma Clarke, 1976
Cryptophlebia carpophagoides Clarke, 1951
Cryptophlebia carreella Guillermet, 2013
Cryptophlebia cartarica Diakonoff, 1984
Cryptophlebia colasi Guillermet, 2006
Cryptophlebia cortesi Clarke, 1987
Cryptophlebia destrumeli Guillermet, 2006
Cryptophlebia distorta (Hampson, 1905)
Cryptophlebia farraginea (Meyrick, 1931)
Cryptophlebia gaetani Guillermet, 2006
Cryptophlebia gomyi Guillermet, 2004
Cryptophlebia hemon Diakonoff, 1983
Cryptophlebia heterospina Razowski, 2013
Cryptophlebia horii Kawabe, 1987
Cryptophlebia illepida (Butler, 1882)
Cryptophlebia iridoschema Bradley, 1962
Cryptophlebia iridosoma (Meyrick, 1911)
Cryptophlebia isomalla (Meyrick, 1927)
Cryptophlebia lasiandra (Meyrick, 1909)
Cryptophlebia melanopoda Diakonoff, in Wittmer & Bttiker, 1983
Cryptophlebia micrometra Diakonoff, 1976
Cryptophlebia moriutii Kawabe, 1989
Cryptophlebia nota Kawabe, 1978
Cryptophlebia notopeta Diakonoff, 1988
Cryptophlebia ombrodelta (Lower, 1898)
Cryptophlebia omphala Razowski, 2013
Cryptophlebia pallifimbriana Bradley, 1953
Cryptophlebia palustris Komai & Nasu, 2003
Cryptophlebia peltastica (Meyrick, 1921)
Cryptophlebia perfracta Diakonoff, 1957
Cryptophlebia phaeacma (Meyrick, 1931)
Cryptophlebia repletana (Walker, 1863)
Cryptophlebia rhizophorae Vri, 1981
Cryptophlebia rhynchias (Meyrick, 1905)
Cryptophlebia saileri Clarke, 1987
Cryptophlebia scioessa (Turner, 1946)
Cryptophlebia semilunana (Saalmuller, 1880)
Cryptophlebia sigerui Kawabe, 1995
Cryptophlebia strepsibathra (Meyrick, 1928)
Cryptophlebia sumatrana Diakonoff, 1957
Cryptophlebia toxogramma (Meyrick, 1925)
Cryptophlebia toxotis (Diakonoff, 1953)
Cryptophlebia vitiensis Bradley, 1953
Cryptophlebia williamsi Bradley, 1953
Cryptophlebia yasudai Kawabe, 1972

See also
List of Tortricidae genera

References

External links
tortricidae.com

Grapholitini
Tortricidae genera